Meadowbrook is a census-designated place in Chesterfield County, Virginia. The population as of the 2010 Census was 18,312. It is named after the old Meadowbrook Farm owned by the Jeffress family, which later turned into the Meadowbrook Country Club (Chesterfield County, Virginia).

References

Census-designated places in Chesterfield County, Virginia
Census-designated places in Virginia